Leslie Claire Margaret Caron (born 1 July 1931) is a French and American actress and dancer. She is the recipient  of a Golden Globe Award, two BAFTA Awards and a Primetime Emmy Award, in addition to nominations for two Academy Awards. She is one of the last surviving stars from the Golden Age of Hollywood cinema.

Caron began her career as a ballerina. She made her film debut in the musical An American in Paris (1951), followed by roles in The Man with a Cloak (1951), Glory Alley (1952) and The Story of Three Loves (1953), before her role of an orphan in Lili (also 1953), which earned her the BAFTA Award for Best Foreign Actress and garnered nominations for an Academy Award and a Golden Globe Award.

As a leading lady, Caron starred in films such as The Glass Slipper (1955), Daddy Long Legs (1955), Gigi (1958), Fanny (1961), both of which earned her Golden Globe nominations, Guns of Darkness (1962), The L-Shaped Room (1962), Father Goose (1964) and A Very Special Favor (1965). For her role as a single pregnant woman in The L-Shaped Room, Caron, in addition to receiving a second Academy Award nomination, won the Golden Globe Award for Best Actress in a Motion Picture – Drama and a second BAFTA Award.

Caron's other roles include Is Paris Burning? (1966), The Man Who Loved Women (1977), Valentino (1977), Damage (1992), Funny Bones (1995), Chocolat (2000) and Le Divorce (2003). In 2007, she won the Primetime Emmy Award for Outstanding Guest Actress in a Drama Series for portraying a rape victim in Law & Order: Special Victims Unit.

Early life and family 
Caron was born in Boulogne-sur-Seine, Seine (now Boulogne-Billancourt, Hauts-de-Seine), the daughter of Margaret (née Petit), a Franco-American dancer on Broadway, and Claude Caron, a French chemist, pharmacist, perfumer and boutique owner. Claude Caron was the founder of the artisanal perfumier Guermantes. While her older brother, Aimery Caron, became a chemist like their father, Leslie was prepared for a performing career from childhood by her mother. The family lost its wealth during World War II and could not provide a dowry for Caron. "My mother said: 'There's only one profession that leads you to marrying money and becoming a princess or duchess, and that's ballet.' ... My grandfather whispered heavily: 'Margaret, you want your daughter to be a whore?' I heard it. This has always followed me".

During WWII, the family lost their fortune. Caron recalled, "My mother died of it". Her mother, who had grown up in poverty, could not cope with their reduced circumstances. She became depressed and an alcoholic and, at age 67, killed herself.

Career
Caron was initially a ballerina. Gene Kelly discovered her in the Roland Petit company "Ballet des Champs Elysées" and cast her to appear opposite him in the musical An American in Paris (1951), a role for which a pregnant Cyd Charisse was originally cast. The prosperity, sunshine and abundance of California was a cultural shock to Caron. She had lived in Paris during the German occupation, which left her malnourished and anemic. She later remarked how nice people were in comparison to wartime Paris, in which poverty and deprivation had caused people to be bitter and violent. She had a friendly relationship with Kelly, who nicknamed her "Lester the Pester" and "kid". Kelly helped the inexperienced Caron—who had never spoken on stage—adjust to filmmaking..

Her role led to a seven-year MGM contract. The films which followed included the musical The Glass Slipper (1955) and the drama The Man with a Cloak (1951), with Joseph Cotten and Barbara Stanwyck. Still, Caron has said of herself: "Unfortunately, Hollywood considers musical dancers as hoofers. Regrettable expression." She also starred in the musicals Lili (1953, receiving an Academy Award for Best Actress nomination), with Mel Ferrer; Daddy Long Legs (1955), with Fred Astaire; and Gigi (1958) with Louis Jourdan and Maurice Chevalier.

Dissatisfied with her career despite her success ("I thought musicals were futile and silly", she said in 2021; "I appreciate them better now"), Caron studied the Stanislavski method. In the 1960s and thereafter, Caron worked in European films as well. For her performance in the British drama The L-Shaped Room (1962), she won the BAFTA Award for Best British Actress and the Golden Globe, and was nominated for the Best Actress Oscar. Her other film assignments in this period included Father Goose (1964) with Cary Grant; Ken Russell's Valentino (1977), in the role of silent-screen legend Alla Nazimova; and Louis Malle's Damage (1992). Sometime in 1970, Caron was one of the many actresses considered for the lead role of Eglantine Price in Disney's Bedknobs and Broomsticks, losing the role to British actress Angela Lansbury.

In 1967, she was a member of the jury of the 5th Moscow International Film Festival (MIFF). In 1989, she was a member of the jury at the 39th Berlin International Film Festival.

Caron returned to France in the early 1970s, which she later said was a mistake. "They adore someone who's really British or really American", Caron said, "but somebody who's French and has made it in Hollywood – and I was the only one who had really made it in a big way – they can't forgive". During the 1980s, she appeared in several episodes of the soap opera Falcon Crest as Nicole Sauguet. Caron is one of the few actresses from the classic era of MGM musicals who are still active in film — a group that includes Rita Moreno, Margaret O'Brien and June Lockhart. Caron's later credits include Funny Bones (1995) with Jerry Lewis and Oliver Platt; The Last of the Blonde Bombshells (2000) with Judi Dench and Cleo Laine; Chocolat (2000) and Le Divorce (2003), directed by James Ivory, with Kate Hudson and Naomi Watts.

On June 30, 2003, Caron traveled to San Francisco to appear as the special guest star in The Songs of Alan Jay Lerner: I Remember It Well, a retrospective concert staged by San Francisco's 42nd Street Moon Company. In 2007, her guest appearance on Law and Order: Special Victims Unit earned her a Primetime Emmy Award. On April 27, 2009, Caron traveled to New York as an honored guest at a tribute to Alan Jay Lerner and Frederick Loewe at the Paley Center for Media.

For her contributions to the film industry, Caron was inducted into the Hollywood Walk of Fame on December 8, 2009, with a motion pictures star located at 6153 Hollywood Boulevard. In February 2010, she played Madame Armfeldt in A Little Night Music at the Théâtre du Châtelet in Paris, which also featured Greta Scacchi and Lambert Wilson.

In 2016, Caron appeared in the ITV television series The Durrells (produced by her son Christopher Hall) as the Countess Mavrodaki.

Veteran documentarian Larry Weinstein's Leslie Caron: The Reluctant Star premiered at the Toronto International Film Festival (TIFF) on June 28, 2016.

Personal life

In September 1951, Caron married American George Hormel II, a grandson of George A. Hormel, the founder of the Hormel meat-packing company. They divorced in 1954. During that period, while under contract to MGM, she lived in Laurel Canyon in a Normandie style 1927 mansion near the country store on Laurel Canyon Blvd. One bedroom was all mirrored for her dancing rehearsals.

Her second husband was British theatre director Peter Hall. They married in 1956 and had two children: Christopher John Hall, a television drama producer, and Jennifer Caron Hall, a writer, painter and actress. Her son-in-law, married to Jennifer, is Glenn Wilhide, a producer and screenwriter.

Caron had an affair with Warren Beatty in 1961. When she and Hall divorced in 1965, Beatty was named as a co-respondent and was ordered by the London court to pay the costs of the case. In 1969, Caron married Michael Laughlin, the producer of the film Two-Lane Blacktop; the couple divorced in 1980.

Caron was also romantically linked to Dutch television actor Robert Wolders from 1994 to 1995.

From 1981, she rented and lived for a few years in a mill (the "Moulin Neuf") in the French village of Chaumot, Yonne, which had belonged to Prince Francis Xavier of Saxony in the late 18th century and which depended on his princely castle. Caron's mother had committed suicide in her 60s; suffering from a lifetime of depression, Caron also considered doing so in 1995. She was hospitalized for a month and began attending Alcoholics Anonymous. Unhappy with the lack of acting opportunities in France, she returned to England in 2013.

In her autobiography, Thank Heaven, she states that she obtained American citizenship in time to vote for Barack Obama for president.

In October 2021, she was chosen to receive the Oldie of the Year Award by The Oldie magazine. It was initially offered to Queen Elizabeth II, who had declined it on the grounds that she did not meet the criteria, even though she was five years older than Caron.

Filmography

Theatre
 1955: Orvet, by Jean Renoir, director Jean Renoir, Théâtre de la Renaissance, Paris
 1955: Gigi, by Anita Loos, director Sir Peter Hall, New Theatre, London
 1961: Ondine, by Jean Giraudoux, director Peter Hall, Aldwych Theatre, London. The second act of this Royal Shakespeare Company production was broadcast on BBC Television on April 11, 1961.
 1965: Carola, by Jean Renoir, director Norman Lloyd, PBS, Los Angeles
 1975–1981: 13, rue de l'amour (Monsieur Chasse), by Georges Feydeau, director Basil Langton, US and Australia
 1978: Can-Can, musical by Cole Porter & Abe Burrows, director John Bishop, US and Canadian tour
 1983: The rehearsal by Jean Anouilh, director Gillian Lynne, English tour
 1984: On your toes by Rodgers and Hart, director George Abbott, US tour
 1985: One for the Tango (Apprends-moi Céline) by Maria Pacôme, director Pierre Epstein, US tour
 1985: L'inaccessible, author and director Krzysztof Zanussi, Théâtre du Petit Odéon of Paris and Spoleto Festival, Italy
 1991: Grand hotel, adaptation from the novel of Vicki Baum, director Tommy Tune, Berlin
 1991: Le martyre de Saint Sebastien by Claude Debussy and Gabriele d'Annunzio, narration, directed by Michael Tilson Thomas, London Symphony Orchestra
 1995: Georges Sand et Chopin, author Bruno Villien, Greenwich Festival, Great Britain
 1997: Nocturne for lovers, adaptation Gavin Lambert, director Kado Kostzer, Chichester Festival Theatre, Great Britain
 1997: The story of Babar, by Jean de Brunhoff, narration, music from Francis Poulenc, Chichester Festival, Great Britain
 1998: Apprends-moi Céline, by Maria Pacôme, director Raymond Acquaviva, French tour
 1999: Readings from Colette, director Roger Hodgeman, Melbourne Festival, Australia
 1999: Nocturne for lovers, director Roger Hodgeman, Melbourne Festival, Australia
 2006: I Remember It Well  Special Guest Artist in a retrospective tribute to Lyricist Alan Jay Lerner (and his music), 42nd Street Moon Theatre Company, Herbst Theatre, San Francisco
 2009: Thank Heaven  – 'platform' at the Théâtre National of London
 2009: A Little Night Music by Stephen Sondheim, director Lee Blakeley, Théâtre du Châtelet, Paris
 2014: Six Dance Lessons in Six Weeks by Richard Alfieri, director Michael Arabian, Laguna Playhouse, Laguna Beach, California

Recordings 
 The Lover (l'Amant) by Marguerite Duras on cassettes
 First World War for the radio
 Le Martyre de Saint Sébastien by Claude Debussy and Gabriele d'Annunzio, with the London Symphony Orchestra, conducted by Michael Tilson Thomas
 Gigi by Colette in English on cassettes recorded in public at Merkin Concert Hall at Abraham Goodman House in New York City, 1996
 Narrated "Carnival of the Animals" music by Camille Saint-Saëns with the Nash Ensemble – Wigmore Hall, 1999
 The Plutocrats play for the BBC dir. Bill Bryden, written by Michael Hastings, from the novel by Booth Tarkington, January 1999

Bibliography 
 Caron, Leslie: Vengeance. Doubleday, 1982.  
 Caron, Leslie: Thank Heaven: A Memoir. Viking Adult, 2009.

Honors
 Chevalier de la Légion d'honneur by President François Mitterrand in June 1993
 Ordre National du Mérite, by Catherine Trautmann, Minister of Culture, in February 1998
 Officier de la Légion d'Honneur, given by Prime Minister Jean Pierre Raffarin in June 2004
 Medaille D'Or De La Ville De Paris in 2012
 Commandeur de la Légion d'honneur in March 2013
 John F Kennedy Center Gold Medal in the Arts in 2015
 The Oldie of the Year (TOOTY) in 2021
 Emmy Award for Outstanding Guest Actress in a Drama Series in 2007

See also
 List of dancers

References

External links 

 
 
 

1931 births
20th-century American actresses
20th-century American dancers
20th-century French actresses
20th-century French dancers
21st-century American actresses
21st-century American non-fiction writers
21st-century French actresses
21st-century French non-fiction writers
American autobiographers
American ballerinas
American female dancers
American film actresses
American musical theatre actresses
American stage actresses
American television actresses
American voice actresses
Best British Actress BAFTA Award winners
Best Drama Actress Golden Globe (film) winners
Best Foreign Actress BAFTA Award winners
Commandeurs of the Légion d'honneur
Commandeurs of the Ordre des Arts et des Lettres
French autobiographers
French ballerinas
French emigrants to the United States
French female dancers
French film actresses
French people of American descent
French musical theatre actresses
French stage actresses
French television actresses
French voice actresses
Living people
Metro-Goldwyn-Mayer contract players
Officers of the Ordre national du Mérite
People from Boulogne-Billancourt
Primetime Emmy Award winners
Women autobiographers
MGM Records artists